Fengtai Nanlu station is an interchange station on Line 9 and Line 16 of the Beijing Subway.
Line 9 opened on December 31, 2011, whilst Line 16 opened on December 31, 2022. The platform for line 16 is parallel to the current platform of line 9. Weekday peak through service of Fangshan line to Line 9 started on January 18, 2023.

Station Layout 
Both the line 9 and line 16 stations have underground island platforms. There are 7 exits, lettered A1, A2, B1, B2, C, D and E. Exits A1 and B2 are accessible via elevators.

Gallery

References

External links 

Beijing Subway stations in Fengtai District
Railway stations in China opened in 2011